Brett Alan Conway (born March 8, 1975) is a former professional American football player.  He was a placekicker for seven seasons with various teams in the National Football League.  He was drafted in the third round (#90 overall) by the Green Bay Packers in the 1997 NFL Draft.  Conway played college football at Penn State, where his 276 career points rank him second all-time, and his 119 consecutive extra points are a school record.

He kicked in four bowl games: Citrus, Rose, Outback, and Fiesta.

External links
 "Conway Knows Path Of Itinerant Kicker", Lynn Zinzer, The New York Times, October 12, 2003
 Audio Interview with Brett Conway, Mark Harrington, Fight On State, May 4, 2005

1975 births
Living people
Players of American football from Atlanta
American football placekickers
Penn State Nittany Lions football players
Washington Redskins players
New York Jets players
Oakland Raiders players
Cleveland Browns players
New York Giants players